James Edward Hunter (March 8, 1954 – August 2, 2010) was an American football defensive back who played for the Detroit Lions in the National Football League (NFL).  Hunter was the 10th player picked in the 1976 NFL Draft after playing for the late great Eddie Robinson at Grambling State University. Hunter is 7th all-time for interceptions in Lions history and is still considered one of the greatest players to ever play at Grambling. His son, Javin Hunter, played for Notre Dame and was drafted by the Baltimore Ravens in 2002. His grandson, Jaden Ivey played basketball at Purdue University and was drafted by the Detroit Pistons in the 2022 NBA draft. Hunter also has a daughter, Marisa Hunter.  

Nicknamed "Hound Dog" for his long-striding running ability, he made an instant impact in the NFL.  The 6-foot-3, 195-pound cornerback led the Lions with seven pass interceptions and was runner-up to future Pro Football Hall of Famer Mike Haynes as  NFL Rookie Defensive Player of the Year.  He got his first start in 1976 at free safety, subbing for another Lions’ great, Dick Jauron who had broken his leg.  He shifted to left cornerback in 1977 playing alongside another future Pro Football Hall of Famer, Lem Barney. In his seven seasons with the Lions (1976–82), Hunter led the Lions in three seasons in pass interceptions (1976, ’77 and ’80) and had 27 career interceptions.  He played in 86 Lions games before a neck injury sustained late in the 1982 season ended his career.

Hunter, Jimmy "Spiderman" Allen, and David Hill recorded a remake of Queen's hit "Another One Bites the Dust" in 1980.

On November 14, 2019, it was announced that Hunter would be part of the 2020 Black College Football Hall of Fame induction class.

Awards
Inducted into African-American Sports Hall of Fame (1996)
Inducted into Southwestern Athletic Conference Hall of Fame (SWAC) (1997)
Slated to be inducted into the Black College Football Hall of Fame in 2020

References

External links
NFL.com player page

1954 births
2010 deaths
People from Silsbee, Texas
American football cornerbacks
American football safeties
Grambling State Tigers football players
Detroit Lions players